Flaxmere is a township in the Hastings District and outlying suburb of Hastings City, in the Hawke's Bay Region of New Zealand's North Island. It consists of a series of cul-de-sacs, radiating from a main street.

History
The original European owner of the land was Sir William Russell, for many years of local member of parliament and Leader of the Opposition from 1894 to 1901. Russell called his estate Flaxmere. When Hastings City Council needed to expand, subdivision of the land started in 1963 and in the following year, the area was incorporated into the area held by the (then) city council. The subdivision was named after the original estate name. Russell's son, Harold Russell, inherited a homestead Little Flaxmere and land that was part of original estate. This is today located in nearby Twyford.

Demographics

Flaxmere had a population of 11,142 at the 2018 New Zealand census, an increase of 1,623 people (17.1%) since the 2013 census, and an increase of 1,203 people (12.1%) since the 2006 census. There were 2,949 households, comprising 5,439 males and 5,697 females, giving a sex ratio of 0.95 males per female, with 3,408 people (30.6%) aged under 15 years, 2,685 (24.1%) aged 15 to 29, 4,002 (35.9%) aged 30 to 64, and 1,035 (9.3%) aged 65 or older.

Ethnicities were 36.5% European/Pākehā, 59.1% Māori, 24.4% Pacific peoples, 2.0% Asian, and 0.6% other ethnicities. People may identify with more than one ethnicity.

The percentage of people born overseas was 12.6, compared with 27.1% nationally.

Although some people chose not to answer the census's question about religious affiliation, 41.6% had no religion, 41.9% were Christian, 7.1% had Māori religious beliefs, 0.3% were Hindu, 0.3% were Muslim, 0.4% were Buddhist and 1.6% had other religions.

Of those at least 15 years old, 420 (5.4%) people had a bachelor's or higher degree, and 2,289 (29.6%) people had no formal qualifications. 258 people (3.3%) earned over $70,000 compared to 17.2% nationally. The employment status of those at least 15 was that 4,011 (51.9%) people were employed full-time, 861 (11.1%) were part-time, and 474 (6.1%) were unemployed.

Description
Flaxmere was built to cater to the housing demand of Hastings. Flaxmere was intended to be an upper-middle class subdivision but because land was subdivided into smaller lots it turned into a low income neighbourhood.

It has a small shopping centre with a supermarket, petrol station, post office, bakery, video store, butchery, indoor rock climbing centre, and various other businesses offering necessities and/or leisure. Other amenities include a library, police station, several churches and an indoor swimming complex, Flaxmere Waterworld.

Education

Flaxmere has four primary schools:

The township also has two other schools:

All these schools are co-educational. Rolls are as of

References

Suburbs of Hastings, New Zealand